Norton Subcourse is a small village and parish in the county of Norfolk, England, about  south-west of Great Yarmouth.

The villages name means 'North farm/settlement'. The village was held by the Subcourse family, possibly a corruption of 'Surlecors'.

Its church, St Mary, is one of 124 existing round-tower churches in Norfolk.

Norton Subcourse is mentioned in the Domesday Book as one of the settlements in Clavering hundred.

Notes 

http://kepn.nottingham.ac.uk/map/place/Norfolk/Norton%20Subcourse

External links

St Mary's on the European Round Tower Churches website

Villages in Norfolk
Civil parishes in Norfolk